"L'Été indien" (French for "Indian summer") is a 1975 single by American/French singer named Joe Dassin. . In the song he reflects with fond memories of his lover, who he met during an indian summer, but with whom he has now lost contact.

Background
The song was based on the song "Africa" by Toto Cutugno, Vito Pallavicini, Pasquale Losito, and Sam Ward (originally released by Toto Cutugno's band ), hence the subtitle ["L'Été indien (Africa)"] on some single releases. It was adapted into French by Claude Lemesle and Pierre Delanoë, arranged by Johnny Arthey and produced by Jacques Plait. "L'Été indien" went on to become Dassin's biggest hit, selling almost 2 million copies worldwide.

Track listing
7" Single
 "L'Été indien (Africa)" – 4:30
 "Moi j'ai dit non" – 2:20

Usages In Rhythmic Gymnastics
 In 2010 Israeli gymnast Neta Rivkin used the tune for her ribbon routine.
 In 2011 Russian gymnast Yevgeniya Kanayeva designed her hoop routine with this music in preparation for the World Championships to be held at Montpellier, France.

Cover versions
 French actor and comedian Guy Bedos performed a parody of the song, entitled "Le Tube de l'Hiver".
 Polish dance singer Mandaryna recorded a cover of the song for her debut album Mandaryna.com in 2004, and released it as her second single.
 Nancy Sinatra and Lee Hazlewood released an English language cover of the song as a single in 1976. A previously unreleased extended version was included on Sinatra's 2009 digital only collection, Cherry Smiles - The Rare Singles. A remastered version of the original single edit was released digitally on October 21, 2020 as the first single from Sinatra's Start Walkin' 1965-1976. Another version without Sinatra also appeared on the 1976 Hazlewood album 20th Century Lee.
 Hungarian singer Kati Kovács recorded a cover of the song on her ninth album, Csendszóró (Silentophone) in 1977, entitled "Indián nyár".
 Slovak actor and singer Michal Dočolomanský recorded a cover of the song, entitled "Ľúbim Ťa" (means 'I love You'), together with a vocal group Bezinky, on the SP in 1977.
 A German Version exists by Peter Alexander ("Liebe kommt so wie ein bunter Schmetterling")
 An Italian Version "Africa" exists by Toto Cutugno
 A Spanish Version "Africa" exists by Joe Dassin
 A French Version "L'ete indien" exists by Joe Dassin
 A Hungarian version "Indián nyár" exists by Kati Kovács, lyrics Iván Bradányi
 A Finnish version "Kuusamo" exists by Danny, lyrics Juha Vainio
 A Greek version "Όνειρα" ("Dreams") exists, by Dakis and later Teris Chrisos, lyrics Sasa Maneta

 A version in the style of Peruvian cumbia (also known as "chicha") called "Indian Summer" exists by Brooklyn-based band Chicha Libre

Commercial performance 
The Joe Dassin version reached no. 1 on the French singles sales chart compiled by the Centre d'Information et de Documentation du Disque  in 1975.

Charts

Weekly charts

Year-end charts

References

Songs about heartache
Songs about parting
1975 singles
2004 singles
French songs
Mandaryna songs
1975 songs
CBS Records singles
Joe Dassin songs
Songs written by Toto Cutugno
Songs with lyrics by Vito Pallavicini
Songs written by Pierre Delanoë
Songs written by Claude Lemesle
Number-one singles in France
Number-one singles in Israel
Song recordings produced by Jacques Plait